Trochilodes is a genus of bristle flies in the family Tachinidae.

Species
 Trochilodes leonardi (West, 1925)
 Trochilodes skinneri Coquillett, 1903

References

Dexiinae
Taxa named by Daniel William Coquillett
Diptera of North America
Tachinidae genera